A bloodsucker is an animal that practices hematophagy.

Bloodsucker may also refer to:

 Bloodsucker, an alternate term for a vampire
 Bloodsucker lizards, some agamid lizards of the genus Calotes
 The Bloodsucker beetle, Rhagonycha fulva

Music
 Bloodsucker, a 1994 maxi-CD by Paralysed Age
 Bloodsuckers (The Varukers album)
 Bloodsuckers (Vamps album)
 "Bloodsucker", a Deep Purple song from the 1970 album Deep Purple in Rock
 "Bludsucker", Deep Purple's remake of the song from the 1998 album Abandon
 "Bloodsucker", an Agnostic Front song from the 1998 album Something's Gotta Give
 "Bloodsucker", a song by A Day to Remember from the 2021 album You're Welcome
 "Bloodsuckers", a song by Die Krupps from the 1993 album II - The Final Option
 "Bloodsuckers", a song by Judas Priest from the 2001 album Demolition

Films
 Bloodsuckers, alternative title of I Drink Your Blood
 Bloodsuckers, US title of 1971 film Incense for the Damned
 Bloodsuckers (1989 film), a film by Dejan Šorak
 Bloodsuckers (1997 film), a horror film by Ulli Lommel
 Bloodsuckers (2005 film), a science fiction film starring Joe Lando and A. J. Cook
 Bloodsuckers (2021 film), a German comedy film

Other
 Bloodsuckers (1993 game), by Pangea Software
 Blood Sucker (manga), written by Saki Okuse and drawn by Aki Shimizu
 Bloodsucker, comic book character, see list of Teenage Mutant Ninja Turtles characters
 Bloodsucker, a mutant in the game S.T.A.L.K.E.R.: Shadow of Chernobyl